Island council elections were held in the Netherlands Antilles on 20 April 2007 to elect the members of the island councils of its five island territories. They were the last regular island council elections before the dissolution of the Netherlands Antilles in 2010.

The election was won by the Bonaire Patriotic Union (5 seats) in Bonaire, the Party for the Restructured Antilles (7 seats) in Curaçao, the Windward Islands People's Movement (4 seats) in Saba, the Democratic Party Statia (4 seats) in Sint Eustatius, and the Democratic Party (6 seats) in Sint Maarten.

Results

Bonaire

Curaçao

Saba

Sint Eustatius

Sint Maarten

References

Netherlands
Council elections
Netherlands Antilles island council elections
Netherlands Antilles island council elections
Elections in the Netherlands Antilles
Elections in Bonaire
Elections in Curaçao
Elections in Saba (island)
Elections in Sint Eustatius
Elections in Sint Maarten
Election and referendum articles with incomplete results